Hot Mulligan is an American emo band from Lansing, Michigan.

History
In 2015, Hot Mulligan released two EPs titled Fenton and Honest & Cunning via Michigan based label Save Your Generation Records. After signing to No Sleep Records in 2017, Hot Mulligan re-released an EP titled Opportunities (original release on Save Your Generation). In 2018, Hot Mulligan released their debut full-length album titled Pilot on No Sleep Records. In 2020, they released their second album, You'll Be Fine, also on No Sleep.

Band members
Current
Nathan “Tades” Sanville - lead vocals (2014–present)
Chris Freeman - rhythm guitar, backing vocals (2016–present), drums (2014–2015)
Ryan "Spicy" Malicsi - lead guitar (2016–present)
Brandon Blakeley - drums (2016–present)

Former
Brett Annelin - lead guitar (2014–2015)
Montana Svaboda - bass (2014–2015)
Dylan Bowie - rhythm guitar, backing vocals (2014–2016)
Brendan Lambert - drums (2015–2016)
Garrett "Sniff" Willig - bass (2016–2021)

Touring
David Daignault - bass (2021–2022)
Jonah Kramer - bass (2022)

Timeline

Discography
Studio albums
Pilot (2018, No Sleep Records)
You’ll Be Fine (2020, No Sleep Records)
Why Would I Watch (2023, Wax Bodega)
EPs
Fenton (2014 Self Released, 2015 re-released Save Your Generation Records)
Honest & Cunning (2015, Save Your Generation Records)
Split 7" w/ Everyone Leaves (2016, Save Your Generation Records)
Opportunities (2016 Save Your Generation Records, 2017 re-released/remastered No Sleep Records)
I Won’t Reach Out to You (2021, Wax Bodega)
Acoustic Vol. 1 (2021, Wax Bodega)
Acoustic Vol. 2 (2022, Wax Bodega)

Compilation albums
SYG Years (2018, Save Your Generation Records)

Singles

Tours

References

American emo musical groups
American pop punk groups
Musical groups from Michigan
Musical groups established in 2014
2014 establishments in Michigan
No Sleep Records artists